Popular Mechanics (often abbreviated as PM or PopMech) is a magazine of popular science and technology, featuring automotive, home, outdoor, electronics, science, do-it-yourself, and technology topics. Military topics, aviation and transportation of all types, space, tools and gadgets are commonly featured.

It was founded in 1902 by Henry Haven Windsor, who was the editor and—as owner of the Popular Mechanics Company—the publisher. For decades, the tagline of the monthly magazine was "Written so you can understand it." In 1958, PM was purchased by the Hearst Corporation, now Hearst Communications.

In 2013, the US edition changed from twelve to ten issues per year, and in 2014 the tagline was changed to "How your world works." The magazine added a podcast in recent years, including regular features Most Useful Podcast Ever and How Your World Works.

History

Popular Mechanics was founded in Chicago by Henry Haven Windsor, with the first issue dated January 11, 1902. His concept was that it would explain "the way the world works" in plain language, with photos and illustrations to aid comprehension. For decades, its tagline was "Written so you can understand it." The magazine was a weekly until September 1902, when it became a monthly. The Popular Mechanics Company was owned by the Windsor family and printed in Chicago until the Hearst Corporation purchased the magazine in 1958. In 1962, the editorial offices moved to New York City.

From the first issue, the magazine featured a large illustration of a technological subject, a look that evolved into the magazine's characteristic full-page, full-color illustration and a small 6.5" x 9.5" trim size beginning with the July, 1911 issue. It maintained the small format until 1975 when it switched the larger standard trim size. Popular Science adopted full-color cover illustrations in 1915, and the look was widely imitated by later technology magazines.

Several international editions were introduced after World War II, starting with a French edition, followed by Spanish in 1947, and Swedish and Danish in 1949. In 2002, the print magazine was being published in English, Chinese, and Spanish and distributed worldwide. South African and Russian editions were introduced that same year.

Notable articles have been contributed by notable people including Guglielmo Marconi, Thomas Edison, Jules Verne, Barney Oldfield, Knute Rockne, Winston Churchill, Charles Kettering, Tom Wolfe and Buzz Aldrin, as well as some US presidents including Teddy Roosevelt and Ronald Reagan. Comedian and car expert Jay Leno had a regular column, Jay Leno's Garage, starting in March, 1999.

Editors 

*Note that in general, dates are the inclusive issues for which an editor was responsible. For decades, the lead time to go from submission to print was three months, so some of the dates might not correspond exactly with employment dates. As the Popular Mechanics web site has become more dominant and the importance of print issues has declined, editorial changes have more immediate impact.

Awards 
 1986 National Magazine Award in the Leisure Interest category for the Popular Mechanics Woodworking Guide, November 1986. 
 2008 National Magazine Award in the Personal Service category for its "Know Your Footprint: Energy, Water and Waste" series. 
 The magazine has received eight National Magazine Award nominations, including 2012 nominations in the Magazine of the Year category and the General Excellence category.

Criticisms
In June 2020, following several high-profile takedowns of statues of controversial historical figures, Popular Mechanics faced criticism from primarily conservative commentators and news outlets for an article that provided detailed instructions on how to take down statues.

In early December 2020, Popular Mechanics published an article titled "Leaked Government Photo Shows 'Motionless, Cube-Shaped' UFO." In late December, paranormal claims investigator and fellow of the Committee for Skeptical Inquiry (CSI), Kenny Biddle, investigated the claim in Skeptical Inquirer.  Biddle reported that both he and fellow investigator Mick West, also a CSI fellow, easily explained the supposed UFO as a mylar balloon, with Biddle even claiming to have identified the design as a Batman balloon. Biddle, previously a PopMech fan, wrote in his Popular Misinformation article:

Further reading

 
 
A nearly complete archive of Popular Mechanics issues from 1905 through 2005 is available through Google Books. 
Popular Mechanics' cover art is the subject of Tom Burns' 2015 Texas Tech PhD dissertation, titled Useful fictions: How Popular Mechanics builds technological literacy through magazine cover illustration. 
Darren Orr wrote an analysis of the state of Popular Mechanics in 2014 as partial fulfillment of requirements for a master's degree in journalism from University of Missouri-Columbia.

References

External links 

 
 Google Books archive
 Popular Mechanics South African edition
 
 
 Works by or about Popular Mechanics at Google Books

Monthly magazines published in the United States
Science and technology magazines published in the United States
Hearst Communications publications
Magazines established in 1902
Magazines published in New York City
Popular science magazines
Ten times annually magazines